6 Tauri, also designated t Tauri, is a chemically peculiar star in the northern constellation of Taurus. It has an apparent visual magnitude of 5.8, so, according to the Bortle scale, it is faintly visible from suburban skies at night.

A stellar classification of B9III matches that of a B-type giant star, but a more detailed analysis gives a type of kB8HeB9.5V(HgMn), indicating a main sequence mercury-manganese star. Mercury-manganese stars are chemically peculiar stars with a specific over-abundance of mercury and manganese absorption lines in their spectra.

6 Tauri has a mass 2.8 times that of the Sun and a radius 2.5 times the Sun's. Evolutionary models indicate that it is still on the main sequence with an age of 224 million years.

References

Taurus (constellation)
Tauri, f
Tauri, 006
1079
Durchmusterung objects
Mercury-manganese stars
021933
016511
B-type giants
B-type main-sequence stars